Hyposmocoma nemoricola is a species of moth of the family Cosmopterigidae. It was first described by Lord Walsingham in 1907. It is endemic to the Hawaiian island of Molokai. The type locality is the forest above Pelekunu.

External links

nemoricola
Endemic moths of Hawaii
Biota of Molokai
Moths described in 1907
Taxa named by Thomas de Grey, 6th Baron Walsingham